Tenuopus is a genus of flies in the family Dolichopodidae. It is the only genus in the subfamily Tenuopodinae, which was created by Igor Grichanov in 2018. The genus was previously placed in the subfamily Neurigoninae, and it also shares some features of Peloropeodinae and Sciapodinae. All species are known from the Afrotropical realm.

Species

Tenuopus acrosticalis Curran, 1927
Tenuopus birketti Grichanov, 2019
Tenuopus bururiensis Grichanov, 2018
Tenuopus cognatus Parent, 1934
Tenuopus comorensis Grichanov, 2019
Tenuopus erroneus Parent, 1934
Tenuopus frontalis Curran, 1927
Tenuopus fursovi Grichanov, 1996
Tenuopus gorongosaensis Grichanov, 2018
Tenuopus guttatus Parent, 1939
Tenuopus kononenkoi Grichanov, 1996
Tenuopus kirkspriggsi Grichanov, 2018
Tenuopus kylei Grichanov, 2018
Tenuopus lomholdti Grichanov, 2018
Tenuopus maculatus Parent, 1931
Tenuopus makarovi Grichanov, 2021
Tenuopus ntchisi Grichanov, 2000
Tenuopus shcherbakovi Grichanov, 1996
Tenuopus soderlundi Grichanov, 2018
Tenuopus taitensis Grichanov, 2000
Tenuopus unicolor (Becker, 1914)
Tenuopus zverevi Grichanov, 1996

References

Dolichopodidae genera
Dolichopodidae
Diptera of Africa
Taxa named by Charles Howard Curran